HMS Galatea was one of seven  armoured cruisers built for the Royal Navy in the mid-1880s. She was sold for scrap on 5 April 1905.

Design and description
The ship's complement was 484 officers and ratings.

Galateas main armament consisted of two breech-loading (BL)  Mk V guns, one gun fore and aft of the superstructure on pivot mounts. Her secondary armament was ten BL  guns, five on each broadside. Protection against torpedo boats was provided by six quick-firing (QF) 6-pounder Hotchkiss guns and ten QF 3-pounder Hotchkiss guns, most of which were mounted on the main deck in broadside positions. The ship was also armed with six 18-inch (457 mm) torpedo tubes: four on the broadside above water and one each in the bow and stern below water.

The ends of the armour belt were closed off by transverse bulkheads .

Construction and service
Galatea, named for the eponymous figure from Greek legend, was laid down on 21 April 1885 by Robert Napier and Sons at their shipyard in Govan, Glasgow. The ship was launched on 10 March 1887, and completed in March 1889.

Captain Charles Henry Cross was appointed in command in September 1898, and was briefly succeeded by Captain Richard William White in March–April 1900, then by Captain Robert Dalrymple Barwick Bruce. She served as coast guard ship at Humber district based at Hull in 1900 and 1902. She was under the command of Captain Robert Stevenson Dalton Cuming from February 1902 until February 1903, during which she took part in the fleet review held at Spithead on 16 August 1902 for the coronation of King Edward VII, and visited Copenhagen the following month.

Notes

References
 
 
 
 

 

Orlando-class cruisers
1887 ships